Oroville is a city located in the northern bulk of the Okanogan Highlands in north-central Washington, United States. Oroville is a member municipality of Okanogan County, Washington, situated between Omak and Penticton. The population was 1,686 at the 2010 census.

History
Oroville was first settled by Caucasian settlers in the late 1850s and known as 'rag town.' The settlement was named Oro, after the Spanish word for gold, in 1892 after the surrounding gold mines and in an attempt to attract prospectors and merchants. The Post Office objected to the name "Oro" because a town was already named "Oso" in Washington, so the name was changed to Oroville, in 1909. Oroville was a stop along the Spokane Falls and Northern Railway line from British Columbia to Spokane, via Molson and Chesaw. In 1914 a third branch south to Wenatchee was constructed to avoid the steep inclines on the original Spokane track.

Passenger train service to Oroville was operated by the Great Northern Railway until July 14, 1953, with freight operations continuing later.

Oroville started to become a tourist location; in the mid-2000s, large condo developments were proposed. The city had an economy peak in 2005–2007, but has continued suffering since to the 'great recession.' It is home to the Dorothy Scott Airport, an international municipal airport with U.S. Customs check, located two miles outside of the town center that was opened in August 1937.

Geography
It is located at the south end of Osoyoos Lake, which empties into the Okanogan River on the east side of the town; the town is bound to the west by the Similkameen River. U.S. Route 97 runs through Oroville.

Climate
Oroville lies in a climatic region that is typified by large seasonal temperature differences, with warm to hot summers and moderately cold winters.  According to the Köppen climate classification system, Oroville has a humid continental climate, Dfb on climate maps.

Economy
Most of the economy of Oroville and the surrounding areas is based on agriculture.  Numerous orchards and a few grape vineyards are within the town limits. During Oroville's heyday as a mining town, many saloons, restaurants, shops, and a drive-in movie theater were there.  Today, the town's economy is depressed with a nearly 30% poverty rate and a median household income of only $22,000.  Recently, three vacation cottage developments have been built, two east of Lake Osoyoos, Sandalia, and the Veranda Beach Resort, and one just north of downtown, Sonora Shores.

The city is home to a weekly newspaper, the Okanogan Valley Gazette-Tribune, established in 1905 as the Oroville Weekly Gazette.

Oroville is the northern terminus of the Cascade and Columbia River Railroad, a short line railroad owned by Genesee & Wyoming.

Demographics

2010 census
At the 2010 census there were 1,686 people in 698 households, including 434 families, in the city. The racial makeup of the city was 78.8% White, 0.8% African American, 2.4% Native American, 1.1% Asian, 0.1% Pacific Islander, 12.7% from other races, and 4.2% from two or more races. Hispanic or Latino of any race were 21.4%.

Of the 698 households 33.1% had children under the age of 18 living with them, 45.6% were married couples living together, 10.7% had a female householder with no husband present, 5.9% had a male householder with no wife present, and 37.8% were non-families. 32.1% of households were one person and 16.3% were one person aged 65 or older. The average household size was 2.41 and the average family size was 3.03.

The median age was 39.4 years. 26.2% of residents were under the age of 18; 7.5% were between the ages of 18 and 24; 23.3% were from 25 to 44; 26.2% were from 45 to 64; and 16.7% were 65 or older. The gender makeup of the city was 49.2% male and 50.8% female.

2000 census
At the 2000 census, there were 1,653 people, 691 households, and 433 families in the town. The population density was 1,336.5 people per square mile (514.7/km). There were 794 housing units at an average density of 642.0 per square mile (247.2/km). The racial makeup of the town was 82.34% White, 0.12% African American, 4.23% Native American, 0.30% Asian, 0.30% Pacific Islander, 9.32% from other races, and 3.39% from two or more races. Hispanic or Latino of any race were 17.06% of the population.

Of the 691 households 32.1% had children under the age of 18 living with them, 45.6% were married couples living together, 13.3% had a female householder with no husband present, and 37.2% were non-families. 32.0% of households were one person and 14.5% were one person aged 65 or older. The average household size was 2.37 and the average family size was 2.99.

The age distribution was 28.9% under the age of 18, 5.1% from 18 to 24, 25.6% from 25 to 44, 23.7% from 45 to 64, and 16.7% 65 or older. The median age was 38 years. For every 100 females, there were 94.0 males. For every 100 females age 18 and over, there were 88.3 males.

The median household income was $22,301 and the median family income  was $30,114. Males had a median income of $25,833 versus $21,750 for females. The per capita income for the town was $12,220. About 22.6% of families and 28.9% of the population were below the poverty line, including 37.0% of those under age 18 and 19.5% of those age 65 or over.

Crime

According to the Uniform Crime Report statistics compiled by the Federal Bureau of Investigation  in 2012, two violent crimes and 78 property crimes per 100,000 residents occur per year. Of these, the violent crimes consisted of one forcible rape, no robberies, and one aggravated assault, while 20 burglaries, 57 larceny-thefts, one motor vehicle theft, and no arson defined the property offenses.

References

External links
 Official website

Cities in Washington (state)
Cities in Okanogan County, Washington
Washington (state) populated places on the Okanogan River
Populated places in the Okanagan Country